Ugna Mahadev Mandir is a Hindu temple in Bhawanipur, Madhubani district in the Indian state of Bihar. The temple is located 14 km from Madhubani and 180 km away from Patna. It is thought that this place is where Lord Shiva showed his original being to Mahakavi Vidyapati. Ugna was incarnation of Lord Shiva as a servant of his favorite devotee and great Maithili poet Vidyapati.

See also 
 Mithila
 Madhubani, Bihar
 Darbhanga

References

External links 

Hindu temples in Bihar
Shiva_temples_in_Bihar
Madhubani district